Marion is a city in Linn County, Iowa, United States. The population was 26,294 at the 2000 census and was 41,535 in 2020, an increase of 58%. The city is located next to Cedar Rapids and part of the Cedar Rapids Metropolitan Statistical Area.

History 
The town was named after Francis Marion, a hero of the Revolutionary War. The site was selected in 1839 to be the first county seat of the newly organized Linn County. After years of debate over moving the county seat to Cedar Rapids, it was put to a vote in 1919. The vote was 9,960 in favor of moving the seat and 4,823 not in favor.

Each year, the city hosts the annual "Swamp Fox Festival", a celebration of Marion's heritage named in honor of the "Swamp Fox", Francis Marion's nickname during the Revolutionary War. The event typically includes a 5K run, parade, fireworks, and many other family friendly activities.

The town was the home to St. Berchman's Seminary, established in 1905 by the Sisters of Mercy as a boarding school for small boys. The academy, which closed in 1942, consisted of five buildings spread over 23 acres. One of the most famous residents was actor Don Ameche, who lived in the facility as a boy; he went on to star in the movie Cocoon. Today, the main building, now housing apartments, is all that remains.
The current site of the Indian Creek Country Club was once the home of a sulky horse racing track. In November 2019, Mayor Nick AbouAssaly won a second term over Mary Lou Pazour with 70 percent of the vote.

Geography
Marion is located at  (42.037649, −91.592925).

Climate

Economy

The Marion Economic Development Corporation, a public–private partnership, was founded in 1984 to support business and economic development in the city.

Demographics

2010 census
As of the census of 2010, there were 34,768 people, 14,108 households, and 9,308 families living in the city. The racial makeup of the city was 94% White, 2.0% African American, 0.3% Native American, 1.3% Asian, 0.5% from other races, and 1.9% from two or more races. Hispanic or Latino of any race were 2.0% of the population.

There were 14,108 households, of which 34.8% had children under the age of 18 living with them, 52.5% were married couples living together, 9.8% had a female householder with no husband present, 3.6% had a male householder with no wife present, and 34.0% were non-families. 28.4% of all households were made up of individuals, and 9.6% had someone living alone who was 65 years of age or older. The average household size was 2.44 and the average family size was 3.02.

The median age in the city was 36.1 years. 26.5% of residents were under the age of 18; 7% were between the ages of 18 and 24; 29.3% were from 25 to 44; 24.2% were from 45 to 64; and 13.1% were 65 years of age or older. The gender makeup of the city was 48.3% male and 51.7% female.

2000 census
As of the census of 2000, there were 26,294 people, 10,458 households, and 7,174 families living in the city. The racial makeup of the city was 97.01% White, 0.60% African American, 0.19% Native American, 0.94% Asian, 0.03% Pacific Islander, 0.40% from other races, and 0.84% from two or more races. Hispanic or Latino of any race were 1.10% of the population.

There were 10,458 households, out of which 34.5% had children under the age of 18 living with them, 57.1% were married couples living together, 8.4% had a female householder with no husband present, and 31.4% were non-families. 26.0% of all households were made up of individuals, and 7.9% had someone living alone who was 65 years of age or older. The average household size was 2.47 and the average family size was 3.00.

Age spread:26.4% under the age of 18, 8.2% from 18 to 24, 31.9% from 25 to 44, 22.2% from 45 to 64, and 11.4% who were 65 years of age or older. The median age was 35 years. For every 100 females, there were 94.4 males. For every 100 females age 18 and over, there were 91.1 males.

The median income for a household in the city was $48,591, and the median income for a family was $59,110. Males had a median income of $40,766 versus $26,241 for females. The per capita income for the city was $23,158. About 3.9% of families and 5.2% of the population were below the poverty line, including 7.2% of those under age 18 and 5.4% of those age 65 or over.

Arts and culture

Museums
The Granger House Museum is a restored middle-class family home, representing the structural design of the American Victorian age. The house, built in the 1840s, showcases an extensive collection that includes many original furnishings. The brick carriage house, built in 1879 next to the Granger home, is an untouched treasure and the only one of its design in the Midwest. The Granger house is listed on the National Register of Historic Places, and embodies the lifestyle of a middle-class family living in the late 19th century. The museum has guided tours, demonstrations, and seasonal activities bringing the town's history to life.

The Marion Heritage Center is a church building used originally by the Methodists from the 1850s until 1875. Currently it serves as a community center for educational programs. The history of Marion and its citizens are on display, including art exhibits. Lectures, workshops and other cultural events are scheduled to provide insights into the town's past. In 2008 the center became the permanent home for the fresco mural Communication by Mail painting, by the artist Dan Rhodes in 1939. The building is open all year.

Festivals
The Marion Arts Festival is a one-day event showcasing 50 artists from across the country. Continuous live music and specialty food vendors are also featured. There is a 5K run with prizes awarded to the top four winners and for the top three placers in 15 different age categories, thanks to race sponsors. In a less competitive event there is the 5K fun walk. The race uses "chip time technology" allowing every participant to know their exact time to complete the race.

The Swamp Fox Festival and Parade is a celebration of the past and the present, the annual Swamp Fox Festival honors Marion's namesake and Revolutionary War hero, Francis Marion, aka the Swamp Fox.  Some of the many scheduled events include a golf outing, picnic in the park, live music, craft show, 5K run and fun walk, a pancake breakfast and a community parade.

The Uptown Marion Market features fresh produce, baked goods, honey, flowers, plants, meat, wines, and an array of artisan items.  In addition, food vendors onsite offer a variety of take-and-eat items. The market also features live entertainment, cooking demonstrations, children's entertainment, and healthy living programming for all ages.

Sports
Hunters Ridge Golf Course and Country Club is a public golf course featuring bentgrass from tee to green, four sets of tees, 50 bunkers, and 10 water hazards. Hunters Ridge is spread over 400 acres. The front nine winds through a development while holes 10–18 are narrow with many ponds and wetlands entering the field of play.

Indian Creek Golf and Country Club The 9-hole private course and Country Club facility in Marion, Iowa opened in 1926 features 2,680 yards of golf from the longest tees for a par of 34 . The course rating is 35.2 and it has a slope rating of 114 on Rye grass.

Squaw Creek Golf Course is a public course constructed in 1968 and designed by Herman Thompson.  Greens are Bent Grass and Fairways are Bluegrass.  The course is owned and maintained by Linn County.

Education
Public education facilities
Marion is served by three public school districts: Marion Independent School District, Linn-Mar Community School District, and Cedar Rapids Community School District. Two of districts have discussed merging on a number of occasions, dating back to the 1950s.  Such a consolidation seems unlikely now, given the size of each school.

Marion ISD encompasses much of the south and east sides of Marion.
Linn-Mar, which operates Linn-Mar High School, includes land primarily on Marion's north, west, and far east sides and areas of Cedar Rapids. Linn-Mar is one of the fastest growing school systems in the state of Iowa.

Private education facilities
St. Joseph School (of the Roman Catholic Archdiocese of Dubuque)) is a prekindergarten through 8th Grade school founded in 1947. It is a Co-ed school with approximately  students enrolled.
Grace Baptist School is a K-12 co-ed school with  students enrolled.

Being part of the Cedar Rapids metropolitan area Marion citizens have access to all of the advanced education opportunities that are available in the area. See the Cedar Rapids Education section for more details.

Media

Print 
The Gazette is the primary daily newspaper for the Cedar Rapids / Marion metro area.

The Marion Times is weekly newspaper primarily covering Marion Community and School news.

Transportation
U.S. 151 and Iowa Highway 13 run north-south through Marion. Seventh Avenue is the major arterial road heading toward Cedar Rapids.

Until 1971, the Milwaukee Road operated several streamliner passenger trains from major cities in the west to Chicago in the east, making their Cedar Rapids regional stop at Marion station.

Bus Route 20 of Cedar Rapids Transit serves Marion.

Notable people 

Carey Bender (born 1972), NFL running back
Ray Cheetany (born 1977), All American football player at UNLV and founder of RawTeams.com – The Sports Social Network
Cherry Sisters, siblings who formed vaudeville touring act in late 19th century
Swati Dandekar, Iowa State Senator District 18
W. Franklin Dove, educator
George Greene, Justice of Iowa Supreme Court
John L. Grindell, Wisconsin State Assemblyman
Richard Haines (1906–1984), painter and muralist
Bryce Janey, blues rock musician
Ben F. Jensen (1892–1970), U.S. Representative for former Iowa's 7th congressional district
Christian Joy, fashion designer
Frank Lanning, actor
Ron Livingston, actor in shows such as Office Space, Sex and the City, Defying Gravity and Band of Brothers
Thomas J. McKean, general in Union Army during Civil War
Lee Moorhouse, photographer
Sarah Lacina, police officer, and winner of Survivor: Game Changers
Bob Nielson, football head coach, University of South Dakota
Marcus Paige (born 1993), basketball player at University of North Carolina
Christopher Reed, former Republican candidate for U.S. Senate
Hartzell Spence, writer
Kiah Stokes (born 1993), basketball player for University of Connecticut and WNBA's New York Liberty
Dale O. Thomas, wrestling coach at Oregon State and member of National Wrestling Hall of Fame

See also

Marion Economic Development Company

References

External links

Official Site of Marion, IA
City Data Statistical Data and more about Marion, Iowa
History of Marion, IA
Marion Economic Development Company
Marion Chamber of Commerce
St. Joseph School
Grace Baptist School
The History of Linn county, Iowa not authored Western Historical Company (1878 copyright expired) This searchable and pdf downloadable book was scanned into the public domain by Google books.
History of Linn County Iowa by Luther A. Brewer and Barthinius L. Wick The Pioneer Publishing Company (1911 copyright expired) This searchable and pdf downloadable book was scanned into the public domain by Google books.

 
Cities in Iowa
Cities in Linn County, Iowa
Cedar Rapids, Iowa metropolitan area
Populated places established in 1839
1839 establishments in Iowa Territory